The 2018 United States Senate election in Delaware took place on November 6, 2018, to elect a member of the United States Senate to represent the State of Delaware, concurrently with other elections to the United States Senate, elections to the United States House of Representatives, and various state and local elections.

The primary for this U.S. Senate election was held on Thursday, September 6, 2018. The Democratic Party nominated incumbent U.S. Senator Tom Carper and the Republican Party nominated Sussex County Councilman Rob Arlett.

Incumbent Democratic Senator Tom Carper was re-elected to a fourth term.

Background

Three-term Democratic Senator Tom Carper was reelected with 66% of the vote in 2012 against Republican Kevin Wade.

Carper, incumbent U.S. Senator, was challenged in the Democratic primary by Dover activist Kerri Evelyn Harris. Carper previously faced a primary challenge in the 2012 election from businessman 	Keith Spanarelli. However, Carper defeated Spanarelli by around 70 points. Carper went on to defeat Harris by around 30 points. It was the most competitive Democratic U.S. Senate primary in Delaware in two decades.

The main declared candidates in the Republican primary were Sussex County councilman Rob Arlett and businessman Gene Truono, with a perennial candidacy from businessman Rocky De La Fuente, who also ran for Senate in seven other states. Another candidate withdrew before the primary. Rob Arlett defeated Gene Truono in a landslide to win the Republican nomination.

Democratic primary

Candidates

Nominee
 Tom Carper, incumbent U.S. Senator and 71st Governor of Delaware

Eliminated in primary
 Kerri Evelyn Harris, Dover activist and U.S. Air Force veteran

Withdrew
 Tykiem Booker, activist

Declined
 Lisa Blunt Rochester, U.S. Representative (running for re-election)

Endorsements

Debates
Delaware newspaper The News Journal hosted a 90-minute debate on August 27, 2018 for the Democratic primary between Tom Carper and Kerri Evelyn Harris at Cab Calloway School of the Arts. Republican candidate businessman Gene Truono answered questions from panelists before Carper and Harris debated. Sussex County Councilman Rob Arlett was also invited, but declined and claimed he had a scheduling conflict.
 Full video of debate, Facebook

Polling

Results

Republican primary

Candidates

Nominee
Rob Arlett, Former Sussex County Councilman, and former Delaware State Chairman for the Trump campaign

Eliminated in primary
Rocky De La Fuente, businessman and perennial candidate
Gene Truono, businessman and former Chief Compliance Officer at PayPal

Withdrew
 Chuck Boyce, businessman (endorsed Rob Arlett)

Declined
 Ken Simpler, State Treasurer (running for re-election)
 Kevin Wade, businessman and candidate for Senate in 2012 and 2014 (endorsed Rob Arlett)

Endorsements

Debates
Councilman Rob Arlett and businessman Gene Truono had four debates in total. They were normally live streamed on Facebook and uploaded to YouTube. A fifth debate was planned, but Truono withdrew from the debate because he the organizers refused to give him control over what questions could not be asked.  Instead organizers held a forum with all the other candidates for the U.S. Senate and other state offices.  Five candidates attended that forum.

First Debate, YouTube
Second Debate, Part 1, YouTube
Second Debate, Part 2, YouTube
Third Debate, Part 1, YouTube
Third Debate, Part 2, YouTube
Fourth Debate, YouTube

Polling

Results

Green primary

Candidates

Nominee
 Demitri Theodoropoulos, small business owner

Declined
 Andrew Groff, businessman and perennial candidate

Endorsements

Libertarian primary

Candidates

Nominee
Nadine Frost, New Castle County chairwoman of Libertarian Party of Delaware and Libertarian nominee for Wilmington City Council in 2016

Independents
Not to be confused with the Independent Party of Delaware, which did not run a candidate for the 2018 United States Senate election.

Candidates

Declared
 Barry Eveland (write-in)
 Matthew Water Stout, write-in presidential candidate in 2016 (write-in)
 Todd Farina, ticket company owner (write-in)

General election

Endorsements
Bold text indicates endorsement was given before the primary.

Debates
with Kerri Evelyn Harris and Gene Truono
On August 20, 2018, the Greater Hockessin Area Development Association (GHADA) hosted a 2-hour debate at the Hockessin Memorial Hall between Democratic candidate Kerri Evelyn Harris and Republican candidate Gene Truono. Tom Carper and Rob Arlett were also invited to the debate, but did not attend. Carper was not present because of the U.S. Senate's extended session due to session ceasing early the Thursday prior because of the death of former Governor and U.S. Senator of Nevada, Paul Laxalt. Arlett declined and claimed he had a scheduling conflict.
 Full video of debate, Facebook August 20, 2018

with Tom Carper and Rob Arlett
The debate gained national attention after Republican candidate Rob Arlett brought up Democratic Senator Tom Carper’s past controversy of domestic abuse.
 Full video of debate, C-SPAN October 17, 2018

with Tom Carper, Rob Arlett, Nadine Frost, and Demitri Theodoropoulos
 Full video of debate, WHYY October 30, 2018

Predictions

Polling

with Tom Carper and Gene Truono

with Kerri Evelyn Harris and Rob Arlett

with Kerri Evelyn Harris and Gene Truono

Results

See also 
 2018 United States Senate elections
 Elections in Delaware

References

External links 
Candidates at Vote Smart
Candidates at Ballotpedia
Campaign finance at FEC
Campaign finance at OpenSecrets

Official campaign websites
Rob Arlett (R) for Senate
Tom Carper (D) for Senate
Demitri Theodoropoulos (G) for Senate

2018
Delaware
United States Senate